Rad. may refer to:

 Rad (artist), American singer-songwriter and keyboardist
 Radical Party (France), a liberal and centrist political party in France

See also
 Rad